Aldo Leao Ramírez Sierra (born 18 April 1981) is a Colombian footballer. He also holds Mexican citizenship.

Ramírez made his debut with Santa Fe of his home country of Colombia and also played for Atlético Nacional where he helped the team capture back-to-back league titles. In 2008 Leão moved to Mexican club Monarcas Morelia, the club where he has spent for the majority of his career. Ramírez has helped Morelia win the 2010 North American SuperLiga and the Apertura 2013 Copa MX. After the departure of goalkeeper Federico Vilar before the Clausura 2014 season, Ramírez was named captain of Morelia by then manager Carlos Bustos.

Ramírez has represented Colombia both at youth and senior level. Ramírez made his debut for the Colombia national football team in 2002 in a friendly against Honduras. Ramírez first goal for Colombia came in a 3–2 loss against England in 2005.

Club career

Santa Fe

Beginning years
Ramírez began his career with Santa Fe of his home country of Colombia where he made his debut in 1999. In his first year as a professional, Santa Fe reached the final of the 1999 Copa Merconorte where they faced América de Cali. At age 18, Ramírez played the full 90 minutes of the first leg while he started the second leg but was substituted at half time by David Hernandez. Santa Fe would end up losing the final 5–3 on penalty kicks. The following year, Ramírez helped Santa Fe finish second in the 2000 Campeonato colombiano season with 74 points, Ramírez appeared in 36 games and scored three goals. In the 2001 season, Leão helped Santa Fe end seventh as he scored three goals in 35 appearances. When the Campeonato colombiano adapted the short tournament, Ramírez appeared in the majority of the games as Santa Fe ended second in the first short tournament in 2002 but the team failed to end in the top eight of the Campeonato colombiano for the next five short tournaments.

Last season in Santa Fe
In the Apertura 2005 season, Ramírez helped Santa Fe end in the top 8 for the first time since the Apertura 2002 season as the team ended in second. Santa Fe won Group B of the semifinals with 12 points one point over Envigado and advanced to the league final against Atlético Nacional. Ramírez played the full 90 minutes in the first leg as the teams drew 0–0 at Santa Fe's Estadio El Campín. Ramírez was substituted out in the 73 minute with the score still tied 0–0 but six minutes later Carlos Alberto Díaz scored and Oscar Echeverry three minutes later as Atlético Nacional won 2–0 on aggregate.

Atlético Nacional

Early club struggles
During the off-season, Ramírez moved to Atlético Nacional, the club who defeated Santa Fe in the league final just the previous season and the club where Ramírez spent his youth years. Ramírez first season at his new club did not go very well as Atlético Nacional ended eleventh place and missed out of the semifinal stage, three spots lower than his former club Santa Fe who did qualify to the semifinals stage. Injuries in 2006 limited Ramírez to appear in 21 matches in both seasons' tournaments (Apertura and Campeonato Finalización) as Atlético Nacional ended both seasons in the top eight but did not win their respective groups in the semifinals stage. Also in 2006, Ramírez made his Copa Libertadores debut in a 3–2 loss against Palmeiras, Ramírez was substituted by Héctor Hurtado in the 81st minute.

Back-to-back titles 
To start out the Apertura season Atlético Nacional stayed undefeated in the first five games, Ramírez started the first two matches as Nacional won both but was relegated to the bench the following three. Ramírez returned to the starting line up in the sixth match against Deportivo Cali but Nacional lost 2–0. His first goal of the season came in a 2–2 draw against Independiente Medellín in week nine. Nacional ended third place with 32 points as Ramírez appeared in the majority of the matches that season either as a substitute or a starter. Ramírez was a big part of Nacional winning the semifinals Group A, he appeared in every match including the 3–2 victory over Boyacá Chico in the final match, which secured them a place in the final against Atlético Huila, the team ended with 13 points two over Deportivo Cali who drew with Ramírez former club Santa Fe 1–1 in the final match.

In the first leg, Nacional won 1–0 with a goal by Carmelo Valencia at Atlético Huila's Estadio Guillermo Plazas Alcid, Ramírez played 89 minutes as he was substituted by Carlos Alberto Díaz. At Nacional's home stadium, Nacional secured the title with a 2–1 victory, Ramírez was considered a crucial player for Nacional during their championship campaign.

Ramírez debuted in the Torneo Finalización season until the second match as he helped his team defeat Santa Fe 2–0, the team drew 0–0 with La Equidad in the first match. Nacional went undefeated in the first eight games of league and the 2007 Copa Sudamericana, Ramírez played in seven out of the eight matches. The team's first defeat came in week six in a home loss against Cúcuta Deportivo. Nacional would end up in first place with 38 points with Ramírez being constantly in the starting eleven.

In the first match of the semifinal group stage, Nacional defeated Once Caldas 1–0, Ramírez was sent off in the 91st minute after an argument with an official. After returning from suspension, Ramírez started the match against América de Cali but Nacional lost 2–1. Nacional advanced to their second straight final when on the final day of the semifinal group stage Nacional and Once Caldas drew 0–0, the club ended with 11 points, one above América de Cali who drew with Cúcuta Deportivo. Nacional faced La Equidad in the final, Ramírez played the full 90 minutes as the club won the first leg 3–0. Back at their home ground Nacional and La Equidad drew 0–0, Ramírez played the full game as he and Nacional won their second straight league title. Once again Ramírez was considered as one of the most important players from Nacional's title run.

Morelia

First seasons in Morelia
On 20 December 2007 it was announced Ramírez was transferred to Mexican club Monarcas Morelia, one day after winning the Torneo Finalización with Nacional. Ramírez made his debut for Morelia at Robertson Stadium in Houston, Texas in a 1–0 loss against Club América at the 2008 InterLiga tournament. Ramírez made his league debut for Morelia in the first match day as Morelia defeated Veracruz 1–0 with a 60-meter goal by Ignacio Carrasco. The following week Ramírez made his home debut for Morelia, Ramírez scored two goals as Morelia defeated Pachuca 3–2. After a promising start of the season, Morelia only managed to win three of the last 15 matches, Ramírez appeared in 16 out of 17 matches as Morelia did not reach the Liguilla. Ramírez started out the Apertura 2008 season with a goal in a 2–2 away draw against San Luis. Morelia would end up with 25 points but did not qualify to the Liguilla as they ended fifth in Group 2, Ramírez appeared in 14 matches which he started most of them.

Return to Colombia
After two short tournaments in Morelia, it was announced on Ramírez was loaned to his former club Atlético Nacional for six months without an option to buy. La Equidad spoiled Ramírez return to Nacional as they defeated Nacional 1–0, Ramírez played the full match. Ramírez appeared and started in 15 of 18 matches and scored a goal against Deportivo Pasto as Nacional ended in 17th place with 16 points. After the season Morelia rejected Nacional's offer to extend Ramírez loan after Morelia manager Tomás Boy expressed his desire for Ramírez to return to the club.

Return to Morelia
Ramírez made his Apertura 2009 season debut in a 1–1 draw against Santos Laguna, Ramírez scored the first goal of the game in the 18 minute. Ramírez would help Morelia end up in third place with 33 points in the classification phase which helped Morelia qualify to the liguilla and the 2010 Copa Libertadores. In the quarterfinals of the liguilla Morelia faced Santos Laguna, who Morelia defeated 4–2 on aggregate, Ramírez appeared as a substitute in the first leg and started the second leg where he assisted Mauricio Martín Romero on the third goal. Morelia faced Cruz Azul in the semifinals where Ramírez appeared in both legs as Cruz Azul defeated Morelia 2–1 on aggregate to advance to the league final against Monterrey.

Ramírez started the Bicentenario season playing nine of the first 10 matches, missing one due to getting sent off against San Luis in the third match. Ramírez missed five games due to an injury, he returned to action in a 2–0 away loss to UNAM. Morelia qualified to the liguilla for the second straight season after ending the season seventh with 25 points. Morelia faced Guadalajara in the quarterfinals, Morelia defeated Guadalajara 5–2 on aggregate, Ramírez started in both legs as Morelia advanced to the semifinals for the second straight season. Morelia faced Santos Laguna in the semifinals, the teams drew in the first leg in Morelia, Santos Laguna blew out Morelia in the second leg in Torreón 7–1, Ramírez appeared in both legs as Morelia were eliminated. Ramírez also played in two Copa Libertadores matches for Morelia, one away at Banfield and a home match against Nacional.

2010–11
Ramírez missed most of the Apertura 2010 season due to health problems, one was due to Orchitis which he was scheduled to be out 15 to 21 days. Orchitis prevented him to play the 2010 North American SuperLiga final against New England Revolution which Morelia won. He returned to action coming in for Ismael Pineda in the 55th minute in a 2–0 home loss to Club América. Ramírez also missed several matches due to a sports hernia. Ramírez returned to action in the 16th week in 1–0 away win over UANL, coming in the 63rd minute for Luis Gabriel Rey. Ramírez finished the Apertura 2010 season coming in as a substitute in a 3–3 draw against Puebla, Ramírez came in as a half time replacement for Luis Gabriel Rey but was sent off seven minutes later along with Puebla's Felipe Ayala after throwing punches, Morelia did not make the liguilla after ending in 12th place with 21 points.

Due to his red card against Puebla in the last match of the season, Ramírez missed the Clausura 2011 opener at Club Atlas. Morelia lost the match 5–0 to an Atlas team who was fighting to stay in the first division and who would end up 10th that season. After sitting out the humiliating loss against Atlas, Ramírez returned in Morelia's home opener against Guadalajara which ended in a 1–1 draw. After playing three straight full matches, Ramírez was sent off in the fifth week match at Club Necaxa after a hard foul on Everaldo Barbosa, it was his second yellow card in 12 minutes. Ramírez returned in an away 2–1 win over Club América, Ramírez assisted Rafael Márquez Lugo in the first goal, 40 seconds into the match. Two weeks later Ramírez scored his first goal of the season in a 6–1 away blowout win over Toluca. It was Morelia's fourth straight win as the team extended their unbeaten streak to eight matches, their only loss was the 5–0 opening loss to Atlas. Morelia's eight-game unbeaten streak came to an end when they fell to league leaders UNAM 1–0 at home, a team who Morelia would end up facing again that season. With Ramírez being a crucial part of the midfield Morelia ended the season with 31 points and ended third place in the classification table and second in their group.

Ramírez and Morelia faced Club América in the quarterfinals and was booked in the 74th minute of the first leg but Morelia won at América's temporary home Estadio Corregidora 2–1. With Ramírez 90 minutes on the field Morelia eliminated América 5–3 on aggregate. During the first leg of the semifinal match against Cruz Azul, Ramírez was booked due to a foul on Gonzalo Pineda. Morelia would end up losing the first leg 2–0 which meant Morelia would have to score at least two goals in the second leg to advance to the final. Ramírez and Morelia would win the second leg 3–0 which made the aggregate score 3–2, Morelia advanced to their first league final since 2003, Ramírez was considered one of the crucial players of the match. The victory was overshadowed when a fan ran out on the field after the third goal and caused a brawl between the players and coaches from both clubs, Ramírez was not one of the five people sent off.

Morelia faced UNAM in the league final at Estadio Morelos, Ramírez performance was praised by various media outlets. Morelia and UNAM would end drawing 1–1 in the first leg in Morelia. After the match Ramírez told the media Morelia had various opportunities to take the lead but did not prevail. Ramírez also stated the team was not nervous and the team showed hierarchy, the UNAM goal was from an error but stated they had more chances to score than UNAM but did not take advantage of them. In the second leg at the Estadio Olímpico Universitario, Ramírez helped Morelia draw a penalty when Miguel Sabah was tripped by Alejandro Palacios inside the penalty box after an intended pass by Ramírez, Jaime Lozano converted the penalty to tie the match. After it looked like it was going to extra time, Javier Cortés went past various defenders including Ramírez as he scored the title clinching goal.

2011–12

Ramírez and Morelia started the Apertura 2011 season visiting newly promoted Club Tijuana, Morelia spoiled Tijuana's first division debut as they won 2–1, Ramírez played the full match. The Apertura 2011 season was the first season Ramírez played every single match for Morelia during the regular season. On July 28, 2011, Ramírez made his CONCACAF Champions League debut in a 5–0 preliminary round win over Tempête FC of Haiti. On September 18, 2011, Ramírez played his 100th league match for Morelia when the team defeated Querétaro 4–2 at Estadio Morelos. Morelia would end the season with in 7th place with 26 points and faced Cruz Azul in the liguilla semifinals. With Ramírez on the field for both legs, Morelia eliminated Cruz Azul from the liguilla for the second straight season. Morelia faced Santos Laguna in the semifinals, Morelia won the first leg 2–1 in Morelia with Ramírez on the field. Morelia fell behind 3–0 in the second leg at Estadio Corona, with the aggregate score at 4–2 Morelia needed three goals to advance to the final. After Ángel Sepúlveda scored 
two goals off the bench, Morelia needed one goal to advance but after a hard foul to his compatriot Carlos Quintero, Ramírez was sent off in the 91st minute, this was considered by many the final blow to Morelia.

Due to his red card in the semifinal match against Santos Laguna, Ramírez did not make his Clausura 2012 debut until the 3–0 loss to UNAM at Estadio Olímpico Universitario. The following week in a match at home against San Luis Ramírez assisted Jaime Lozano in the first goal of the match which Morelia ended winning 2–0. Ramírez played in both legs of the CONCACAF Champions league quarterfinals against Monterrey which they lost 7–2 on aggregate. Ramírez played in 15 of the 17 regular season matches for Morelia and played every single minute of those matches. Ramírez and Morelia ended the season in fourth place with 31 points and faced defending champions UANL in the quarterfinals, UANL won the first leg 1–0 at Estadio Universitario, Ramírez was booked in the 90th minute. Ramírez and Morelia were humiliated at home in the second leg as they were eliminated after a 4–1 loss.

2012–13
Despite various transfer rumors, Ramírez stayed in Morelia and made his Apertura 2012 debut in a scoreless draw against Cruz Azul. On September 14, 2012, in an away match against Pachuca, Ramírez assisted Carlos Ochoa on Morelia's second goal of the match, Morelia ended up losing 3–2. Like the previous season, Ramírez appeared in 15 of the 17 matches but was booked eight times, the most of any of his seasons in Morelia. Morelia ended the season in fifth with 27 points and faced Club América in the quarterfinals, due to getting a call-up from José Pekerman for Colombia's friendly against Brazil, Ramírez was unable to play the first leg in Morelia in which Morelia lost 2–0. Ramírez returned in the second leg at Estadio Azteca but was booked in the 55th minute as Morelia won 2–1 but lost on aggregate 3–2 and were eliminated.

Ramírez was booked in the first game of the Clausura 2013 season against Cruz Azul after a protest to the referee, the match ended in a 3–3 draw. On February 3, 2013, Ramírez played his 150th match for Morelia but the feat was overshadowed by a 3–1 loss to Puebla. Ramírez first assist came when he assisted Jefferson Montero in the first goal in a 3–2 win against Pachuca. His second assist of the season came when he assisted Carlos Ochoa in the third goal of the 4–0 victory over Atlante. His third assist of the season came against Toluca when he headed the ball to Jefferson Montero who put Morelia ahead 1–0, Morelia ended up winning 2–1. When Morelia sacked Rubén Omar Romano and replaced him with Carlos Bustos, Morelia went undefeated in the last 10 matches of the season and ended in fourth place with 30 points. Morelia faced Cruz Azul in the quarterfinals of the liguilla, Ramírez played the full match of the first leg at Estadio Azul as Cruz Azul won 4–2 and ended Morelia's 10 match unbeaten streak. Ramírez was booked in the 52 minute of the second leg which Morelia won 1–0 after a goal by Rodrigo Salinas but it was not enough to advance as the aggregate score was 4–3.

2013–14
Like the previous off seasons there were various rumors of Ramírez being transferred to other Mexican clubs but he stayed in Morelia and made his Apertura 2013 debut in a 3–1 victory at Querétaro. On August 16, 2013, two days after representing Colombia against Serbia in a friendly in Barcelona, Spain, Ramírez assisted Rodrigo Salinas in the first goal and scored the second to lead Morelia to a 2–0 victory over Atlas. Ramírez would later go on to score goals against Monterrey and Chiapas F.C. during the season. After winning their group in the Apertura 2013 Copa MX, Morelia faced Club León in the quarterfinals, Ramírez scored the first goal and assisted Enrique Pérez in the second to lead Morelia to the semifinals. After defeating Monterrey 3–0 in the semifinals at Estadio Tecnológico Morelia advanced to the final. In the final at Estadio Morelos Morelia faced Atlas, Ramírez assisted Edgar Andrade in the second goal to take a 2–0, the match ended 3–3 which forced penally kicks. Ramírez did not shoot any of the penalty kicks as Morelia won 3–1 with Federico Vilar saving three. After not being able to play the 2010 North American SuperLiga final due to a health issue, Ramírez lifted his first championship with Morelia in front of 31,830 fans at Estadio Morelos. Morelia ended the season in sixth place with 27 points and faced León in the quarterfinals without Ramírez who was inexplicably absent but it was later revealed he was injured. Ramírez returned in the second leg but Morelia would get knocked out of the liguilla when they were defeated 4–0 at Estadio León which made the aggregate score of 7–3.

After the departure of goalkeeper Federico Vilar to Atlas before the Clausura 2014 season, Ramírez was named captain of Morelia by then manager Carlos Bustos.

International career

Ramírez made his senior international debut on November 20, 2002, under Francisco Maturana coming in for John Restrepo in a 1–0 loss against Honduras. The following year Ramírez capped twice for Colombia in friendlies against Mexico in Phoenix and South Korea in Busan. After not capping in 2004, Ramírez returned to the national team in a friendly on February 23, 2005, against Mexico in Culiacán and also appeared in a friendly against the United States in Fullerton two weeks later. Ramírez scored his first international goal in a friendly against England in East Rutherford, in which Colombia lost 3–2. He was later called to the 2005 CONCACAF Gold Cup by Reinaldo Rueda where he appeared in three matches as Colombia was eliminated in the semifinals. After going uncapped in 2006, Ramírez appeared in three 2010 World Cup qualifiers in 2007, two as a sub and a start against Venezuela. In 2008, he  appeared in a friendly against Honduras in Fort Lauderdale in which Colombia lost.

Ramírez received a surprising call-up by newly appointed manager José Pékerman in February 2012 to face Mexico in a friendly in Miami Gardens, it was his first call up in nearly four years. Ramírez started the match against Mexico but was later replaced by Abel Aguilar in the 67th minute, Colombia won 2–0 in Pékerman's debut. Pékerman constantly called-up Ramírez for World Cup qualifiers and friendlies, Ramírez is mostly used as a sub but has been praised for his performances off the bench, Ramírez did start in the World Cup qualifying scoreless draw against Argentina in Buenos Aires. Five minutes after coming of the bench in a World Cup qualifier in Santiago on September 11, 2012, Ramírez assisted Radamel Falcao in the go-ahead goal which eventually led Colombia to a 3–1 victory over Chile. Colombia eventually qualified to their first World Cup in 16 years when they drew with Chile in Barranquilla on October 11, 2013, Ramírez stayed on the bench for the match.

Career statistics

Club

International

Honours
Atletico Nacional
Categoría Primera A (2): 2007-I, 2007-II
Morelia
North American SuperLiga (1): 2010
Copa MX (1): Apertura 2013

References

External links
Official site

1981 births
Living people
People from Santa Marta
Naturalized citizens of Mexico
Colombian footballers
Colombian expatriate footballers
Association football midfielders
Independiente Santa Fe footballers
Atlético Nacional footballers
Atlético Morelia players
Atlas F.C. footballers
Cruz Azul footballers
Águilas Doradas Rionegro players
2005 CONCACAF Gold Cup players
Colombia international footballers
Colombian expatriate sportspeople in Mexico
Expatriate footballers in Mexico
Categoría Primera A players
Liga MX players
Sportspeople from Magdalena Department